This is a list of mandolinists, people who don't just play the mandolin but who are known because of their affiliation to the instrument.

Dave Apollon
Pietro Armanini
Jeff Austin of Yonder Mountain String Band
Avi Avital
Butch Baldassari
Jacob do Bandolim
Edgar Bara
Giuseppe Bellenghi
Wayne Benson
Bartolomeo Bortolazzi
C. A. Bracco
Giuseppe Branzoli
Joseph Brent
Jesse Brock
Kenneth C. "Jethro" Burns
Sam Bush
Raffaele Calace
Luigi Castellacci
Giovanni Cifolelli
Mike Compton
Ry Cooder
Ritchie Blackmore of Blackmore's Night
Jules Cottin
Ferdinando de Cristofaro
Dash Crofts of Seals and Crofts
Pietro Denis
John Duffey of The Country Gentlemen and The Seldom Scene
Herbert J. Ellis
Matt Flinner
Giovanni Fouchetti
Dorina Frati
Carlo Antonio Gambara
Jimmy Gaudreau of The Country Gentlemen
Vince Gill
David Gilmour
David Grisman
David Harvey
Levon Helm
Hamilton de Holanda
George H. Hucke
Sierra Hull
Andy Irvine of Sweeney's Men, Planxty, Patrick Street and Mozaik
Ray Jackson of Lindisfarne, who played mandolin on Maggie May
Sarah Jarosz
Cosmo Jarvis
Kurt Jensen
Paul Kelly
Kevin Jonas
John Paul Jones of Led Zeppelin
Michael Kang of The String Cheese Incident
Cheyenne Kimball formerly of Gloriana
Wenzel Krumpholz
Doyle Lawson of Doyle Lawson And Quicksilver
Salvator Léonardi
Ira Louvin
Fabio Machado
Martie Maguire of Dixie Chicks and Court Yard Hounds
Evan Marshall
Mike Marshall
Simon Mayor
Ronnie McCoury of The Del McCoury Band
Jesse McReynolds
Eduardo Mezzacapo
Barry Mitterhoff
Bill Monroe
Tiny Moore
Johnny Moynihan
Carlo Munier
Tim O'Brien
Mike Oldfield
Ugo Orlandi
Bobby Osborne
Peter Ostroushko
Bernardo de Pace
W. Eugene Page
Giuseppe Pettine
Jean Pietrapertosa
Yank Rachell
U. Rajesh
Silvio Ranieri
Déo Rian
Emily Robison of the Dixie Chicks and the Court Yard Hounds
Sandy Rothman, with the Jerry Garcia Acoustic Band
Samuel Siegel
Giuseppe Silvestri
Sinn Sisamouth
Herschel Sizemore of the Dixie Gentlemen, Jimmy Martin, and Bluegrass Cardinals
Ricky Skaggs
U. Srinivas (1969 – 2014) of Shakti
Johnny Staats of Johnny Staats & The Delivery Boys
Andy Statman
Adam Steffey
Alison Stephens
Dinesh Subasinghe
Marty Stuart
Chris Thile of Punch Brothers and Nickel Creek
Niall Toner
Graham Townsend 
Joe Val
Rhonda Vincent
Seth Weeks
Frank Wakefield
Roland White
Chris Leslie of Fairport Convention
Dave Swarbrick of Fairport Convention

References

 
Mandolinist